Gymnopilus rufopunctatus is a species of mushroom-forming fungus in the family Hymenogastraceae.

See also

List of Gymnopilus species

rufopunctatus
Fungi of Europe
Fungi described in 1888